Volokonovka is a rural locality (a selo) and the administrative center of Volokonovskoye Rural Settlement, Chernyansky District, Belgorod Oblast, Russia. The population was 613 as of 2010. There are 11 streets.

Geography 
Volokonovka is located 15 km north of Chernyanka (the district's administrative centre) by road. Zavalishcheno is the nearest rural locality.

References 

Rural localities in Chernyansky District